Wiślna Street (Polish: Ulica Wiślna, lit. Vistulan Street) - a historic street in Kraków, Poland. The street's name originates in 1311. The street runs from the Main Square towards the River Vistula (Wisła). The street extends southwards as Zwierzyniecka Street (Ulica Zwierzyniecka, lit. Smart Street).

Features

References

Streets in Kraków